The Age of Seventeen is a 1929 German silent film directed by Georg Asagaroff and starring Grete Mosheim, Hans Adalbert Schlettow and Martin Herzberg. It was shot at the Terra Studios in Berlin. 
The film's art direction was by Hans Jacoby.

Cast
 Grete Mosheim as Erika Sörensen
 Hans Adalbert Schlettow as Werner von Lingen
 Martin Herzberg as Gert von Lingen
 Vera Baranovskaya as Annemarie von Lingen
 Eduard von Winterstein as Erik Sörensen
 Carl Balhaus as Gerts Freund Martin
 Gerhard Ritterband as Gerts Freund Hans
 Eva Speyer as Mutter Schwarz
 Manfred Voss as Primaner Schwarz
 Heinrich Gotho

References

Bibliography

External links

1929 films
Films of the Weimar Republic
Films directed by Georg Asagaroff
German silent feature films
Terra Film films
German black-and-white films
Films shot at Terra Studios